Fantasy is an album released in 1993 by Swedish pop singer Lena Philipsson.

Track listing

References

1993 albums
Lena Philipsson albums